Rubén Osvaldo Zamponi (born 15 July 1986) is an Argentine professional footballer who plays as a centre-back for UAI Urquiza.

Career
Zamponi's career began with Deportivo Morón in 2003. Two years later, Zamponi completed a move to Flandria of Primera B Metropolitana. Twenty-three appearances followed during the 2005–06 campaign. He rejoined Deportivo Morón in mid-2016, prior to departing for a second time after signing for Fénix. He made forty-one appearances in Primera C Metropolitana as Fénix finished second, eventually losing in the promotion play-offs to Barracas Central. In 2008, Zamponi joined fellow fourth tier team Excursionistas. He scored the first four league goals of his career with them. Primera B Nacional's San Martín signed Zamponi in 2010.

He made his debut with San Martín on 21 August during a 1–0 over Atlético de Rafaela, which was one of twenty-four matches he played for San Martín between 2010 and 2014; which included a loan spell with Banfield throughout the 2012–13 Primera B Nacional. On 4 February 2014, Zamponi agreed to join Primera B Metropolitana side Villa Dálmine. His first goal for them arrived in their 2014 opener versus Almirante Brown, a season which ended with promotion. After two further goals in eighty-nine more games, Zamponi left for Crucero del Norte in Torneo Federal A in August 2017. A year later, Arsenal de Sarandí signed Zamponi and he played 9 times in their promotion season from the Primera Nacional. After making no appearances and only making the bench 4 times in the Primera División, he was released and joined CA Mitre.

UAI Urquiza

Career statistics
.

References

External links

1986 births
Living people
People from Morón Partido
Argentine footballers
Association football defenders
Primera B Metropolitana players
Primera C Metropolitana players
Primera Nacional players
Argentine Primera División players
Torneo Federal A players
Deportivo Morón footballers
Flandria footballers
Club Atlético Fénix players
CA Excursionistas players
San Martín de San Juan footballers
Club Atlético Banfield footballers
Villa Dálmine footballers
Crucero del Norte footballers
Arsenal de Sarandí footballers
Club Atlético Mitre footballers
UAI Urquiza players
Sportspeople from Buenos Aires Province